The 1996 Russian elections were held from 25 February to 29 December. President Boris Yeltsin won re-election on 3 July, defeating Gennady Zyuganov.

Presidential election 

The presidential elections were held on 16 June 1996, with a second round on 3 July.

By-elections to the State Duma 

A by-election took place on 8 December 1996 in the Makhachkala constituency of Dagestan to fill the seat of former member Gamid Gamidov, who was appointed finance minister of Dagestan in April 1996 and was later assassinated on 20 August 1996. Nadirshakh Khachilayev, leader of the Union of Muslims of Russia, won the constituency.

Gubernatorial elections 

The three offices of the heads of federal subjects elected on 12 June 1991, were up for election in first half of the year. President Mintimer Shaymiyev of Tatarstan and Mayor Yury Luzhkov of Moscow re-elected successfully, while Saint Petersburg Mayor Anatoly Sobchak lost to his former deputy Vladimir Yakovlev in runoff.

After Yeltsin secured his second term, the gubernatorial campaign started in more than a half of Russia's federal subjects. In 20 of them heads of administrations appointed by president were defeated by candidates of the People's Patriotic Union of Russia, a left-leaning coalition founded by former presidential candidate Gennady Zyuganov.

Regional legislative elections

References

Sources